State Road 221 (NM 221) is a  state highway in the US state of New Mexico. NM 221's southern terminus is at County Route 303 (CR 303) northeast of Alire, and the northern terminus is at U.S. Route 84 (US 84) in Cebolla.

Major intersections

See also

References

221
Transportation in Rio Arriba County, New Mexico